"Upside Down" is a song by English recording artist Paloma Faith from her debut studio album, Do You Want the Truth or Something Beautiful? (2009). It was released in the United Kingdom on 15 March 2010, by Epic Records as the fourth single from the album. "Upside Down" was written by Faith, Andrew Nicholas Love, Jos Hartvig Jorgensen and Belle Sara Humble, and it was produced by Love and Jorgensen. The song received mixed reviews from critics. "Upside Down" reached a peak position of fifty-five in the UK chart. The music video was directed by Chris Sweeney, who previously directed the video for Faith's third single, "Do You Want the Truth or Something Beautiful?".

Background
Faith performed the song on Simon Mayo's BBC Radio 2 show on 18 January 2010 and became Scott Mills' 'Record of the Week' on BBC Radio 1. "Upside Down" was released by Epic Records on 15 March 2010. The song was accompanied by the B-side "Technicolour".

Reception

Critical response
Before the single was released, Mayer Nissim from Digital Spy said ""Upside Down" backs up Faith's claim to have absorbed influences from the pre-rock 'n' roll era, mixing up a '50s dancehall vibe with her ever-present soul croon.". Charles Decant of Ozap called the single "the more playful title on the album".

Paul English of the Daily Record gave the single four stars. He commented "If they remade Roger Rabbit, Paloma would be Jessica and this would be on the soundtrack. A post-Winehouse jive-time workout, this perky number from the Burlesque-influenced Londoner is begging to be danced to by men with trilby hats and spats. The dominant Faith continues..."

A reporter for the Huddersfield Daily Examiner was less positive towards the song saying "Sets off like some surreal nursery rhyme and never seems to mature that much." While a writer from the Liverpool Echo deemed it one of the worst releases of the week, saying "what it lacks in complexity, lyrics and any real meaning it makes up for in catchiness."

Chart performance
On 14 March 2010, "Upside Down" debuted on the UK Singles Chart at number 89, on downloads alone. The following week, the single climbed to number 58, which was followed by a further climb of 3 places on 28 March 2010 to its current peak at number 55. The song spent two weeks in the chart. On 26 December, the track climbed back into the UK Singles Chart after a strong number of downloads, charting at number 99.

Music video
The video, directed by Chris Sweeney, was described by Faith as looking like "a kind of Kelis/André 3000 type video". Ryan Brockington of the New York Post called the video "amazing", but added "see if you slowly walk backwards searching blindly for an exit". A writer from Sugarscape called it "the sunniest video in all the land".

Track listing

Digital download
"Upside Down" – 3:11
"Technicolour" – 3:00

Digital EP
"Upside Down" – 3:11
"Upside Down" (Cahill Club Remix) – 6:10
"Upside Down" (Widower Remix) – 4:53
"Upside Down" (DC Breaks Remix) – 6:57

Credits and personnel
Credits adapted from Do You Want the Truth or Something Beautiful? album liner notes.

 Paloma Faith – vocals, writer
 Andrew Nicholas Love – writer
 Jos Hartvig Jorgensen – writer
 Belle Sara Humble – writer
 Andy Love – producer, keyboard programming
 Jos Jorgensen – producer, guitar programming

 Steve Fitzmaurice – audio mixing
 Jay Reynolds - additional production
 Jamie Reddington - additional production
 Matthew Waer - upright bass
 Ruthie Phoenix - saxophone
 Linden Berelowitz - drums

Charts

Certifications

Release history

References

External links

"Upside Down" at Last.fm
[ "Upside Down"] at Allmusic

Paloma Faith songs
2010 singles
Songs written by Paloma Faith
2009 songs
Epic Records singles